Yongkang may refer to:


Places

China
 Yongkang, Zhejiang, a city in Zhejiang
 , a subdistrict in Taonan, Baicheng, Jilin
 , a town in Dingyuan County, Anhui
 , a town in Shapotou District, Zhongwei, Ningxia
 , a town in Yongde County, Lincang. Yunnan
 Yongkang Prefecture, a historical name for the former , in the area of present-day Zhengkang and Yongde Counties in Yunnan

Taiwan
 Yongkang District, a district and former city in Tainan, Taiwan

Chinese historical eras
Yongkang (167), an era name used by Emperor Huan of Han
Yongkang (300–301), an era name used by Emperor Hui of Jin
Yongkang (396–398), an era name used by Murong Bao, emperor of Later Yan
Yongkang (412–419), an era name used by Qifu Chipan, ruler of Western Qin
Yongkang (464–484), an era name used by Yujiulü Yucheng, khan of Rouran